The 1906–07 Princeton Tigers men's ice hockey season was the 8th season of play for the program.

Season
Beginning with this season the undergraduates at Princeton were limited to just two sports during one school year. As a result, several players who had tried out for the team in recent years were ineligible to play for the ice hockey team. Despite this setback the team was well represented with many returning members from a year before. Counterbalancing the dearth of players was the team's new practice facility located on Lake Carnegie, the first home venue the Tigers' possessed. After a decent showing in three early games Princeton had to cancel it's Holiday road trip to Norfolk, Virginia and were limited to a single practice game over the winter break. While there was worry that the lack of play would inhibit the team's ability to compete against conference opponents the Tiger's won both games in early January. The fast start was then buoyed by the addition of Thomas Howard as coach.

Princeton's third conference game came to define their season as the Tigers were able to take down four-time defending champion Harvard 4–3. The victory was the first for Princeton over the Crimson and set the icers up for a chance at their first championship. In their final game against Yale the teams battled fairly evenly throughout the extended game (25-minute halves were used rather than the normal 20-minute halves) but a goal by Joshua Brush put the Tigers ahead for good and gave Princeton its first Intercollegiate Hockey Association Championship.

J.G. Thomas served as team manager with F. Leake as his assistant.

Roster

Standings

Schedule and Results

|-
!colspan=12 style=";" | Regular Season

References

Princeton Tigers men's ice hockey seasons
Princeton
Princeton
Princeton
Princeton